"(When You Fall in Love) Everything's a Waltz" is a song co-written and recorded by American country music artist Ed Bruce.  It was released in July 1981 as the second single from the album One to One.  The song reached number 14 on the Billboard Hot Country Singles & Tracks chart.  Bruce wrote the song with his wife Patsy and Ron Peterson.

Chart performance

References

1981 singles
Ed Bruce songs
Songs written by Ed Bruce
Song recordings produced by Tommy West (producer)
MCA Records singles
1981 songs
Songs written by Patsy Bruce